The olive-backed foliage-gleaner (Automolus infuscatus) is a species of bird in the family Furnariidae. It is found in humid forest of most of the Amazon Basin, except in the southeastern part, where the Para foliage-gleaner is found. The two are closely related and were considered conspecific until recently.

References

 Zimmer, K. J. (2002). Species limits in Olive-backed Foliage-gleaners. Wilson Bull. 114: 20–37.

olive-backed foliage-gleaner
Birds of the Amazon Basin
Birds of the Guianas
olive-backed foliage-gleaner
olive-backed foliage-gleaner
Birds of Brazil
Taxonomy articles created by Polbot